Personal Magnetism is a 1913 American silent short film starring Sydney Ayres, Julius Frankenberg, Harry Van Meter, Jacques Jaccard, Louise Lester, Jack Richardson and Vivian Rich.

External links

1913 films
American silent short films
American black-and-white films
Films directed by Lorimer Johnston
1910s American films